Mucolipin-3 also known as TRPML3 (transient receptor potential cation channel, mucolipin subfamily, member 3) is a protein that in humans is encoded by the MCOLN3 gene.  It is a member of the small family of the TRPML channels, a subgroup of the large protein family of TRP ion channels.

Gene
In human, the MCOLN3 gene resides on the short arm of chromosome 1 at 1p22.3.  The gene is split in 12 exons, which entail the open reading frame of 1659 nucleotides.  The encoded protein, TRPML3, has 553 amino acid with a predicted molecular weight of ≈64 kDa.  Computational analyses of the secondary structure predict the presence of six transmembrane domains, an ion transport motif (PF00520) and a transient receptor potential motif (PS50272).
In the mouse, Mcoln3, is located on the distal end of chromosome 3 at cytogenetic band qH2.  Human and mouse TRPML3 proteins share 91% sequence identity.
All vertebrate species, for which a genomic sequence is available, harbor the MCOLN3 gene.  Homologs of MCOLN3 are also present in the genome of insects (Drosophila melanogaster), nematodes (Caenorhabditis elegans), sea urchin (Strongylocentrotus purpuratus) and lower organisms including Hydra and Dictyostelium.

Expression

Function
TRPML3 is an inwardly-rectifying cation channel.

Genetics

Phenotypes
Mutations of the MCOLN3 gene in mice result in auditory hair cell death and deafness.

Ligands
 Agonists (channel activators)
 ML-SA1 (non selective vs TRPML1)
 SN-2 (highly selective for TRPML3)

See also
 transient receptor potential cation channel, mucolipin subfamily, member 1 (MCOLN1)
 transient receptor potential cation channel, mucolipin subfamily, member 2 (MCOLN2)

References

Further reading

External links